The Perijá brushfinch (Arremon perijanus) is a species of bird in the family Emberizidae.

Taxonomy

The Perijá brushfinch was often treated as a subspecies of the stripe-headed brushfinch (A. torquatus), but was determined a distinct species, on the basis of differences in vocalization, plumage, and genetics.  The SACC split the group in 2010.

References

 

Perijá brush finch
Birds of Colombia
Birds of Venezuela
Perijá brush finch